Greatest Hits is a 1975 compilation album by British singer-songwriter Cat Stevens. It reached #2 in the UK Albums Chart and peaked at #6 on the Billboard 200. Though made up mostly of tracks from his five previous studio albums, Cat Stevens' Greatest Hits did contain one new song, "Two Fine People", which was also released as a single in 1975, and the previous non-album single, "Another Saturday Night". Those singles charted at No. 33 and No. 6, respectively, on the Billboard Hot 100 singles chart.

Track listing
All tracks by Cat Stevens, unless otherwise noted.

Side one
"Wild World" – 3:22
"Oh Very Young" – 2:34
"Can't Keep It In" – 2:59
"Hard Headed Woman" – 3:49
"Moonshadow" – 2:49
"Two Fine People" – 3:33

Side two
"Peace Train" – 4:13
"Ready" – 3:16
"Father and Son" – 3:41
"Sitting" – 3:13
"Morning Has Broken" (Eleanor Farjeon) – 3:18
"Another Saturday Night" (Sam Cooke) – 2:29

Charts

Weekly charts

Year-end charts

Certifications and sales

Notes 

1975 greatest hits albums
Cat Stevens compilation albums
A&M Records compilation albums
Island Records compilation albums